The PSA Athlete of the Year is given by the Philippine Sportswriters Association to the best Filipino athletes annually. It is part of the PSA's Annual Awards Night, one of the most prestigious sport-related awards in the Philippines.

Notable athletes who were given this award include Rafael Nepomuceno, Bong Coo, Eric Buhain, Lydia de Vega, Efren Reyes, Manny Pacquiao and Hidilyn Diaz.

Winners

Per year

Multiple-time winners

Special awards
Hall of Fame
Paeng Nepomuceno, 1997: bowling
Bong Coo, 2004: bowling
Eugene Torre, 2006: chess
Manny Pacquiao, 2008: professional boxing
Efren Reyes, 2010:  billiards
Florencio Campomanes, 2010: chess
Mitsubishi Lancer, tennis
Lifetime Achievement Award
Florencio Campomanes, 2006:chess
1973 Philippines men's national basketball team, 2014: basketball
Eugene Torre, 2017: chess
Bong Coo, 2019: bowling
Paquito Rivas, 2019: cycling
Efren Reyes, 2019: billiards
Athlete of the Decade
Manny Pacquiao, 2009: 'professional boxing
Athlete of the Century” 1999
 Paeng Nepomuceno, bowlingAthletes of the Millennium 1999
Lydia de Vega, athletics, track and field
Carlos Loyzaga, basketball
Paeng Nepomuceno, bowling
Bong Coo, bowling
Pancho Villa, professional boxing
Gabriel Elorde, professional boxing
Onyok Velasco, amateur boxing
Eugene Torre, chess
Teófilo Yldefonso, swimming
Felicisimo Ampon, tennisPSA's President's Award''
NU Bulldogs, collegiate basketball
Gilas Pilipinas 2015:

References 

Sports in the Philippines
National sportsperson-of-the-year trophies and awards
Philippine sports trophies and awards
Awards established in 1980